The Amazon rainforest is a species-rich biome in which thousands of species live, including animals found nowhere else in the world. To date, there is at least 40,000 different kinds of plants, 427 kinds of mammals, 1,300 kinds of birds, 378 kinds of reptiles, more than 400 kinds of amphibians, and around 3,000 freshwater fish are living in Amazon.

The Amazon rainforest covers 6.7 million square kilometre, accounting for over 40% of the planet's remaining tropical forests. Since 2000, rainfall has declined across 69% of the Amazon. The WWF estimates that 27% Amazon will be without trees if deforestation continues at its current rate.

Birds
There are more than 1,500 kinds of birds living in the Amazon. Like hummingbirds, Channel-billed toucan, hoatzin and macaws. In one sites of Peruvian Amazon, there are around 575 kinds of birds are found in only a 5,500 hectare section.

In November to March, some birds will migrate from Central American to South American topics. Other are exactly found in Amazon.

Most of the birds are living in undercover dense of Amazon forest because they are looking for insects from rainforest floor to the canopy. Some prefer flying insects, or fruits and flowers, like harpy eagle will capture other mammals and reptiles and birds.

Mammals

There are about 427 different kinds of mammals living in Amazon, with most of them being bats and rodents,  including the largest rodent in the world, the capybara, which can weigh up to 200 pounds (91 kg).

In Amazon forest mammals are on both ground , trees and the air , the jungle are fill with a diversity of different species. When people arrive Amazon forest , they can look at the tallest trees and they can find sloths. Sloths are one of the Amazon most common mammals

References

Amazon rainforest
Fauna of Brazil
Fauna of Peru
Fauna of Colombia
Fauna of Ecuador
Fauna of Venezuela
Fauna of Bolivia
Fauna of French Guiana
Fauna of Guyana
Fauna of Suriname